William Ellsworth "Dummy" Hoy (May 23, 1862 – December 15, 1961) was an American center fielder in Major League Baseball (MLB) who played for several teams from 1888 to 1902, most notably the Cincinnati Reds and two Washington, D.C. franchises.

Hoy is the most accomplished deaf player in MLB history, and is credited by some sources with causing the establishment of signals for safe and out calls. He held the MLB record for games in center field (1,726) from 1889 to 1902, set records for career putouts (3,958) and total chances (4,625) as an outfielder, and retired among the leaders in outfield games (2nd; 1,795), assists (7th; 273), and double plays (3rd; 72).  He was also an excellent baserunner, scoring over 100 runs nine times, and often finishing among the top base stealers.  He is one of only 29 players to have played in four different Major Leagues.  His 1,006 career walks put him second in MLB history behind Billy Hamilton when he retired, and he also ended his career ranking eighth in career games played (1,796).

Career 

Born in the small town of Houcktown, Ohio, Hoy became deaf after meningitis at age three. He graduated from the Ohio State School for the Deaf in Columbus as class valedictorian. In 1888, with the Washington Nationals of the National League, Hoy became the third deaf player in the major leagues, after pitcher Ed Dundon and pitcher Tom Lynch. In his rookie year he led the league in stolen bases (although the statistic was defined differently prior to 1898), and also finished second with 69 walks while batting .274. At 5'4" and batting left-handed, he was able to gain numerous walks with a small strike zone, leading the league twice and compiling a .386 career on-base percentage.

Hoy's speed was a great advantage in the outfield, and he was able to play shallow as a result. On June 19, 1889, he set an MLB record (which has since been tied twice) by throwing out three runners at home plate in one game, with catcher Connie Mack recording the outs. He returned to Washington for two years with the Washington Senators of the National League, and was traded to the Reds in December 1893, where he was reunited with Comiskey.

Hoy later joined the Louisville Colonels, where his teammates included Honus Wagner, Fred Clarke and Tommy Leach (who was his roommate), and he hit .304 and .306 in his two seasons with the club; in  he broke Mike Griffin's Major League record of 1459 games in center field. After playing for the Chicago White Sox in the American League during its last minor league season in 1900, where Comiskey was now the team owner, Hoy stayed with the team when the AL achieved major league status in 1901, helping them to the league's (and his) first pennant; that year he broke Tom Brown's record of 3623 career outfield putouts, and also led the league with 86 walks and 14 times hit by pitch while finishing fourth in runs (112) and on-base percentage (.407). He ended his Major League career with the Reds in 1902, batting .290 and breaking Brown's record of 4461 career total chances in the outfield, and played for Los Angeles in the Pacific Coast League in 1903. In May of his last season with the Reds, he batted against pitcher Dummy Taylor of the New York Giants in the first faceoff between deaf players in the Major Leagues; Hoy got two hits.

Hoy retired with a .288 batting average, 2048 hits, 1429 runs, 725 runs batted in, 248 doubles, 121 triples and 40 home runs. He had 488 stolen bases from 1888 through 1897, and 108 more after the statistic was redefined to its present meaning in 1898. His 1795 games in the outfield ranked second to Jimmy Ryan (then at 1829) in MLB history. Jesse Burkett broke his MLB record for career putouts in 1905, and Clarke topped his record for career total chances in 1909. His record for career games in center field was broken by Tris Speaker in 1920.

Personal life 

In Hoy's time, the word "dumb" was used to describe someone who could not speak, rather than someone who was stupid; but since the ability to speak was often connected to one's intelligence, the epithets "dumb" and "dummy" became interchangeable with stupidity. Hoy himself often corrected individuals who addressed him as William, and referred to himself as Dummy. Said to have been able to speak with a voice that resembled a squeak, he was actually one of the most intelligent players of his time, and is sometimes credited with developing the hand signals used by umpires to this day, though this view is widely disputed; Cy Rigler is believed to have created signals for balls and strikes while working in the minor leagues (although, in the November 6, 1886 issue of The Sporting News, the deaf pitcher Ed Dundon is credited as using hand signals while umpiring a game in Mobile, Alabama on October 20 of that year), and Bill Klem is credited with introducing those signals to the Major Leagues, in the early 20th century. Indeed, no articles printed during Hoy's lifetime have been found to support the suggestion that he influenced the creation of signals, nor did he ever maintain that he had such a role. Nonetheless, due to the possibility that he may have played a role in the use of signals, as well as for his all-around play, there is a movement to support his election to the Baseball Hall of Fame in Cooperstown, New York.

In retirement, Hoy and his wife Anna Maria (who was also deaf) operated a dairy farm in Mount Healthy, Ohio, outside Cincinnati; among their six children was Carson, an Ohio judge, and their grandson, Judson, became a member of the Ohio House of Representatives. They also raised his nephew, Paul Hoy Helms, the founder of the Helms Athletic Foundation in Los Angeles. Hoy also worked as an executive with Goodyear after supervising hundreds of deaf workers during World War I. In 1951 he was the first deaf athlete elected to membership in the American Athletic Association of the Deaf Hall of Fame. At the age of 99 and just two months before his death in Cincinnati following a stroke, the Reds brought him back to Crosley Field, built on the site of his former home field, to throw out the first ball before Game 3 of the 1961 World Series. He could see, if not hear, the standing ovation he received. Upon his death that December, his remains were cremated according to family tradition and were scattered at Lytle Park in Cincinnati.

Legacy 

Upon his death in 1961 at the age of 99, Hoy was the longest-lived former MLB player ever. In 1973, Ralph Miller broke Hoy's record by becoming the first ex-major leaguer to reach the age of 100. Altogether, 13 former big league ballplayers have become centenarians, the oldest being Chet Hoff, who was 107 when he died in 1998.

At the time of his death, Dummy Hoy was the last surviving participant of both the American Association and the Players' League.

In  the baseball field at Gallaudet University was named the William "Dummy" Hoy Baseball Field. Hoy was inducted into the Baseball Reliquary's Shrine of the Eternals in 2004.

The William "Dummy" Hoy Classic is a baseball game held every two years during Rochester, New York Deaf Awareness Week; it is contested between members of the Rochester Recreation Club of the Deaf and the Buffalo, New York Club of the Deaf, at a recreated 19th-century ballpark at Genesee Country Village and Museum.

In 2008, the Documentary Channel aired the biography Dummy Hoy: A Deaf Hero (aka: I See the Crowd Roar). The documentary, using photographs of Hoy and actors to recreate certain events, chronicled the highlights of Hoy's life and his contributions to baseball; Hoy was portrayed by Ryan Lane.

The William Hoy Story: How a Deaf Baseball Player Changed the Game, a children's picture book by Nancy Churnin, was published in 2016.
"Silent Star: The Story of Deaf Major Leaguer William Hoy" by Bill Wise was published in 2012.

The 2019 limited-release movie The Silent Natural, tells the story of Hoy, who is played by Miles Barbee, who is deaf in real life.

The Little-Known Heroes: William 'Dummy' Hoy, a children's picture book by Kaushay and Spencer Ford, was published in 2021.

Notes

References 

Sandy, Steve; Miller, Richard. "No Dummy: William Ellsworth Hoy." Timeline, March–April 2000, pp. 48–53.

External links 

Dummy Hoy Biography – profile and career highlights
DummyHoy.com – website promoting his induction into the Baseball Hall of Fame
The Dummy Hoy documentary film, I See the Crowd Roar

1862 births
1961 deaths
Major League Baseball center fielders
19th-century baseball players
Cincinnati Reds players
Washington Nationals (1886–1889) players
Buffalo Bisons (PL) players
St. Louis Browns (AA) players
Washington Senators (1891–1899) players
Louisville Colonels players
Chicago White Sox players
Baseball players from Ohio
National League stolen base champions
Oshkosh (minor league baseball) players
Los Angeles Angels (minor league) players
Chicago White Stockings (minor league) players
American disabled sportspeople
Deaf baseball players
People from Hancock County, Ohio
American deaf people
People from Mount Healthy, Ohio